Virginia Kirchberger (born 25 May 1993) is an Austrian footballer who plays for Eintracht Frankfurt and the Austria national team.

She was on the Austria squad at UEFA Women's Euro 2017.

In the summer of 2020, Kirchberger made the move to Eintracht Frankfurt in the Frauen Bundesliga ahead of the 2020/21 campaign, after they merged with 1.FFC Frankfurt.

International goals

References

External links
 

1993 births
Living people
MSV Duisburg (women) players
1. FC Köln (women) players
SC Freiburg (women) players
Eintracht Frankfurt (women) players
Austria women's international footballers
Austrian women's footballers
Women's association football defenders
Frauen-Bundesliga players
UEFA Women's Euro 2022 players
UEFA Women's Euro 2017 players
Footballers from Vienna
Austrian expatriate women's footballers
Austrian expatriate sportspeople in Germany
Expatriate women's footballers in Germany